This is a list of brand name condiments. A condiment is a supplemental food, such as a sauce, that is added to some foods to impart a particular flavor, enhance its flavor, or in some cultures, to complement the dish. The term originally described pickled or preserved foods, but has shifted meaning over time. Many diverse condiments exist in various countries, regions and cultures. A brand or mark is a name, term, design, symbol, or other feature that distinguishes an organization or product from its rivals in the eyes of the customer. Brands are used in business, marketing, and advertising.

Brand name condiments

 A.1. Sauce – a brand of steak sauce produced by Kraft Foods
 Aromat – the brand name of a mass-produced general-purpose seasoning produced in Switzerland and South Africa under the brand name Knorr, which is owned by the Unilever group
 AussieMite – the brand name for a dark brown, salty food paste mainly used as a spread on sandwiches and toast 
 Big Twin Sauce – a condiment featured by the Hardee's and Carl's Jr. restaurant chain
 Bisto – a British instant gravy brand
 Cackalacky Classic Condiment – sweet potato-based table condiment 

 Cenovis – a product based on yeast extract that is similar to Marmite and Vegemite
 Chef Brown Sauce – a brown sauce most popular in Ireland
 Daddies – a brand of ketchup and brown sauce in the United Kingdom

 Gentleman's Relish – a brand of anchovy paste also known as Patum Peperium
 Goober – a combination of peanut butter and jelly in a single jar
 Guinness Yeast Extract – a former Irish savoury spread that was a by-product of the Guinness beer brewing process. The product was launched in Ireland on 2 November 1936 and discontinued in 1968.
 Haywards – a brand of various pickles that is popular in the United Kingdom

 Heinz Sandwich Spread – a blend of salad cream and relish popular in the Netherlands and Britain
 Heinz Tomato Ketchup – a ketchup brand first introduced in 1876
 Henderson's Relish – a spicy and fruity condiment, similar in appearance to Worcestershire sauce, but which contains no anchovies
 HP Sauce – a brown sauce brand
 

 Kalles Kaviar – a Swedish brand of smörgåskaviar, a fish roe spread
 Kitchen Bouquet – a browning and seasoning sauce primarily composed of caramel with vegetable flavorings
 Lea & Perrins – a Worcestershire sauce brand
 
 Marmite - a British yeast spread
 Marmite (New Zealand) - a New Zealand yeast spread
 Meadow Lea – one of Australia's leading brands of polyunsaturated margarine spreads
  
  
  
 Nocilla – a hazelnut and chocolate spread
 Nudossi – a hazelnut spread

 Nutella – a hazelnut and chocolate spread
  
  
 Sarson's – a brand of malt vinegar brewed in the United Kingdom.
  
  
 Tata Salt – launched in 1983 by Tata Chemicals as India's first packaged iodised salt brand
 Tabasco - Pepper sauce manufactured in Louisiana, USA 
 Vegemite – an Australian food spread made from leftover brewers' yeast extract with various vegetable and spice additives
 Vegeta – a condiment which is a mixture primarily of salt with flavour enhancers, spices and various vegetables
 Vitam-R - a German yeast spread

Barbecue sauces

 
  
 
 
 
 
  (UK, jerk/BBQ sauce)

Hot sauces

 
 
 
 
 
 
 
 
 Indofood Sambal
 
 
 
 
 
 Tabasco sauce –  an American brand of hot sauce made exclusively from tabasco peppers, vinegar, and salt. It is produced by the McIlhenny Company of Louisiana.

Mayonnaise

Mustards

Salad dressings

  
 
 Wish-Bone – an American brand of salad dressing, marinades, dips and pasta salad

See also

 Condiment
 List of condiments
 List of mustard brands
 List of brand name food products

References

Condiments
Condiments, Brand Name
Condiments